The 1994–95 VfL Bochum season was the 57th season in club history.

Review and events
On 6 November 1994 head coach Jürgen Gelsdorf was sacked. Klaus Toppmöller was appointed head coach on 9 November 1992.

Matches

Legend

Bundesliga

DFB-Pokal

Squad

Squad and statistics

Squad, appearances and goals scored

Transfers

Summer

In:

Out:

Sources

External links
 1994–95 VfL Bochum season at Weltfussball.de 
 1994–95 VfL Bochum season at kicker.de 
 1994–95 VfL Bochum season at Fussballdaten.de 

Bochum
VfL Bochum seasons